The Quasimidi Raven was a German made synthesizer aimed at the dance music market. It also featured an  8-track sequencer, arpeggiators, real-time control knobs and effects. The Raven can be upgraded with the RavenMAX card. This increases the sample wave memory from 6 to 14 MB

Patches
The unit features 512 patches. These include Basses, LeadSynths, SynthPads, Natural Sounds, Organs, FM-Percussion, Effects, Drumsets, Tuned Drums.

References

Polyphonic synthesizers
Digital synthesizers
Products introduced in 1996